Newcomb is a surname. Notable people with the name include:

Anthony Newcomb (born 1941), American musicologist
Bernard A. Newcomb, American businessperson and philanthropist, co-founder of E*TRADE
Bryant B. Newcomb (1867–1945), American politician
Carman A. Newcomb (1830–1902), American politician, lawyer and judge
Cyrenius A. Newcomb, Sr. (1837–1915), American businessman, reformer, and philanthropist
Deborah Newcomb (born 1954), member of the Ohio House of Representatives
George Newcomb (1866–1895), outlaw of the American Old West and member of the Wild Bunch
Frank Newcomb (1846–1934), commodore in the United States Revenue Cutter Service
Harvey Newcomb (1803–1863), American clergyman and writer
Horatio C. Newcomb (1821–1882), American attorney, judge, and politician
James Pearson Newcomb (1837–1907), journalist and Secretary of State of Texas
John Lloyd Newcomb (1881–1954), American educator
Josephine Louise Newcomb (1816–1901), American philanthropist whose grant founded H. Sophie Newcomb Memorial College
Josiah T. Newcomb (1868–1944), New York politician
Mary Newcomb (1893–1966), American actress
Michael Newcomb (disambiguation), multiple individuals
Patricia Newcomb (born 1930), American film producer and publicist
Philip Newcomb (born 1950s), American software engineer
Rexford Newcomb (1886–1968), American academician, architect, and author
Richard Newcomb, American war correspondent
Robert Newcomb, fantasy writer
Ronda Storms (born Ronda Rehnell Newcomb, 1965), American politician
Sean Newcomb (born 1993), American baseball pitcher
Simon Newcomb (1835–1909), Canadian astronomer and mathematician
William Newcomb (1927–1999), American professor and theoretical physicist who devised Newcomb's paradox
Wesley Newcomb (1818–1892), American malacologist (studier of mollusks)

See also
Newcombe, a surname
Newcome, name